Larry Parker (born October 23, 1949) is an American former professional tennis player.

A native of St. Louis, Parker was a collegiate tennis player for Cal Berkeley and made some appearances in professional tennis after graduating in 1971. He featured in the singles main draw of the 1974 Australian Open.

Parker and wife Chris run a bed and breakfast in Murphys, California.

His brother, Jimmy, was also a professional tennis player.

References

External links
 
 

1949 births
Living people
American male tennis players
California Golden Bears men's tennis players
Tennis players from St. Louis